James Short (born 15 October 1989) is an English rugby union player. He plays at Wing for Exeter Chiefs in the Aviva Premiership.  He was educated at Tonbridge School in Kent.

Club career
Short arrived at Saracens in 2007.

The 2010-2011 season was really Short's breakthrough season for the Saracens team. He played regularly in the Saracens team and got a reputation for being a prolific try scorer and was the top try scorer for Saracens. Short also scored the only try in the 2011 Aviva Premiership Final helping Saracens to win their first ever Premiership final in a 22-18 victory over Leicester Tigers. Overall in the season Short made 24 appearances and scored 13 tries.

At the end of the 2013/14 season he joined London Irish.

On 23 July 2015 it was announced that Short would be joining Premiership Rivals, Exeter Chiefs.

References

External links 
 Saracens Profile
 ESPN Scrum Profile

1989 births
Living people
People educated at Tonbridge School
English rugby union players
Rugby union players from Redhill, Surrey
Saracens F.C. players
Rugby union wings